Limonium emarginatum is a species of sea lavender known by the common names Gibraltar sea lavender.

Description
This evergreen is native to southern Spain, Ceuta, Morocco and Gibraltar around the Straits of Gibraltar. The plant creates clumps that are 25 cm high and 50 cm in diameter.

References

emarginatum
Flora of Gibraltar